The Korea Citation Index is a citation index covering research in South Korea.

See also
Korea Research Foundation
Science Citation Index
Social Sciences Citation Index
Arts and Humanities Citation Index

External links
 

Bibliographic databases and indexes
Libraries in South Korea
Citation indices